Paul Domingo Comi (February 11, 1932 – August 26, 2016) was an American film and television actor.

Biography

Paul Comi was born 1932 in Brookline, Massachusetts. Comi grew up in North Quincy, Massachusetts and joined the United States Army after graduation in 1949. He was a three Purple Heart veteran of the Korean War, in which he fought in 1950–1951. After his release from a hospital in Japan he was assigned to Kyoto, where he booked talent and wrote skits for the NCOs and Officers Club. After his discharge, in 1952, he went to California, where he attended El Camino Jr. College and was elected Student Body President for two terms.

Awarded a scholarship to USC School of Dramatic Arts at the University of Southern California, he graduated in 1958 Magna Cum Laude with membership in Tau Kappa Epsilon, Phi Beta Kappa, Phi Kappa Phi and Blue Key honors.

He and his wife Eva had three children. As an apprentice at the La Jolla Playhouse the summer of 1957. 20th Century Fox picked him up and cast him as Pvt Abbott in The Young Lions with Marlon Brando and Montgomery Clift; he would act for four more decades.

Comi died on August 26, 2016, in Pasadena, California, at the age of 84. A US military veteran, he was interred at Riverside National Cemetery in Riverside, California.

Acting career

Comi's acting career spanned four decades, from the mid-1950s through the mid-1990s. He made over three hundred television appearances, twenty movies, and a number of recurring television roles. These included Deputy Johnny Evans in the syndicated western series Two Faces West (1960–61), starring Charles Bateman, the part of Brad Carter, prosecuting attorney in The Virginian while Lee J. Cobb was in the cast. He was cast along with others, including  Bruce Dern and Joby Baker, who were all part of Paul Burke's crew in Burke's initial introduction, on 12 O'Clock High.

Comi's professional acting career began in 1957, when, as an apprentice at the La Jolla Playhouse, he was given a small part in the play Career that starred Don Taylor and Una Merkel. His comedy scene as a drunken GI earned rave reviews in The Hollywood Reporter and Variety, leading to his being signed by 20th Century Fox for the role of Pvt. Abbott in The Young Lions with Montgomery Clift and Dean Martin. At Fox, he appeared in several films: In Love and War with Jeffrey Hunter and Robert Wagner; A Private's Affair with Ernie Kovacs; and was lent out to Warner Bros. for the role of "Jenkins" in the Michael Garrison production of The Dark at the Top of the Stairs with Robert Preston and Dorothy McGuire. He also played Lt Tim, Steve McQueen's assistant in The Towering Inferno.

In 1960, Comi appeared in The Twilight Zone episode "People Are Alike All Over", as Warren Marcusson. Between 1961 and 1962, he portrayed airplane pilot Chuck Lambert on the first-run syndicated television adventure series Ripcord about skydiving and was a regular on the Western series Rawhide. He also played Victor Markham for one and one half seasons on the daytime soap Capitol, followed by two seasons as George Durnley in General Hospital. Besides, he had two guest appearances on Voyage to the Bottom Of The Sea in the episodes "Submarine Sunk Here" and "Deadly Creature Below!"

Comi played navigator Lt. Andrew Stiles for the Star Trek episode "Balance of Terror" (1966).
Comi also appeared in Barnaby Jones in the episode titled "Dangerous Summer" (02/11/1975).

Comi was a voting member of the Academy of Motion Picture Arts and Sciences.

Business interests
He was President of Caffe D'Amore Inc. a coffee company started by his wife, Eva, the creator of the world's first flavored instant cappuccino, Caffe D'Amore.

Partial filmography 

 1958: The Young Lions - Private Abbott (uncredited)
 1958: In Love and War – Father Wallensack
 1959: Warlock – Luke Friendly (uncredited)
 1959: Pork Chop Hill – Sergeant Kreucheberg
 1959: Peter Gunn ("The Rifle") – William Erlich
 1959: 77 Sunset Strip ("The Grandma Caper") – Fred
 1960: A Private's Affair – Military Policeman (uncredited)
 1960: The Rise and Fall of Legs Diamond – Paul (uncredited)
 1960: Two Faces West – Deputy Johnny Evans
 1960: Men Into Space ("Caves of the Moon") – Major John Arnold
 1960: The Untouchables ("One-Armed Bandits") – George Colleoni
 1960: Wake Me When It's Over – Lieutenant Malcolm Bressler (uncredited)
 1960: The Dark at the Top of the Stairs – Jenkins (uncredited)
 1961: The Outsider – Sergeant Boyle
 1960–1963: The Twilight Zone ("People Are Alike All Over" / "The Odyssey of Flight 33" / "The Parallel") – Marcusson / 1st Officer John Craig / Psychiatrist
 1961–1962: Ripcord – Chuck Lambert
 1962: Cape Fear – George Garner
 1962: Stoney Burke ("The Scavenger") – Frank Foley
 1962: 40 Pounds of Trouble – Deputy Sheriff Cavanaugh
 1964-65 Rawhide - Yo Yo (6 episodes)
 1965: The Alfred Hitchcock Hour ("The Crimson Witness") – Modeer
 1965: Twelve O'Clock High ("R/X for a Sick Bird") – Major Adams
 1965: Perry Mason ("The Case of the Sad Sicilian") – Father Reggiani
 1965–1968: The F.B.I. ("Act of Violence" / "The Satellite" / "The Escape" / "The Giant Killer") – Crime Scene Special Agent / SAC Harper / Howard Schaal / Major Slidell
 1966: Blindfold – Barker
 1966: The Time Tunnel ("Massacre") – Captain Frederick Benteen
 1966: Star Trek ("Balance of Terror") – Stiles
 1967: The Invaders ("Storm") – Danny / Sheriff
 1968–1969: Mannix – ("The Playground" / "Another Final Exit") – Rudy / Harry
 1969: All the Loving Couples – Mike Corey
 1971–1973: Cannon ("A Well Remembered Terror" / "No Pockets in the Shroud") – Airline Official / Detective Lou Micelli
 1972: Conquest of the Planet of the Apes – 2nd Policeman
 1974: The Towering Inferno – Tim
 1977: The Streets of San Francisco ("Interlude") – Alexander Dichter
 1980: The Killings at Outpost Zeta – Commander Craig
 1981: Longshot – Coleman
 1981: Dallas ("Waterloo at Southfork") – Dr. McWright
 1982: Death Wish II – Senator McLean
 1984: Best Defense – Chief Agent
 1985: Falcon Crest ("False Hope") – Money Scammer
 1985–1990: Knots Landing ("What If?" / "High School Confidential" / "The Emperor's Clothes") – Doctor / Ed Boyce
 1986: Howard the Duck – Dr. Chapin
 1986: Fame ("The Last Dance") – The Minister
 1987: Spies ("The Game's Not Over" / "'Til the Fat Lady Sings")
 1986–1989: Highway to Heaven ("Summer Camp" / "Parents' Day" / "Children's Children") – Phil Lightell / Sergeant Baker / Harvey
 1991: L.A. Law ("Since I Fell for You" / "On the Toad Again") – Detective Douglas French / Detective
 1995: Baywatch ("Leap of Faith") – Mr. Samuels

Awards and decorations
   Purple Heart (A 3 Purple Heart Veteran of the Korean War)
 Phi Beta Kappa USC 1958, Phi Kappa Phi Honor Society USC 1958, Blue Key Honors USC 1958

See also
 List of The Twilight Zone (1959 TV series) guest stars
 List of Fame (1982 TV series) episodes

References

External links

 
 Filmography, nytimes.com
 Filmography, moviefone.com

1932 births
2016 deaths
Male actors from Boston
American male film actors
American male television actors
20th-century American male actors
USC School of Dramatic Arts alumni
People from Brookline, Massachusetts
Burials at Riverside National Cemetery